The modern sport of axe throwing involves a competitor throwing an axe at a target, attempting to hit the bullseye as near as possible. Axe throwing has historically been an event in lumberjack competitions. As of the fall of 2020 there are commercial locations in Canada, the United States, Australia, New Zealand, United Kingdom and Poland where participants can compete, similar to dart throwing, as well as opportunities at festivals and some theme parks.

Rules
Depending on the type of league, there are different boards and scoring, but the board needs to be made of wood. Generally the wood for axe throwing targets are made from cottonwood, poplar wood or pine wood. In 2020 there were two very popular leagues: IATF (International Axe Throwing Federation, formerly National Axe Throwing Federation) and WATL (World Axe Throwing League). IATF targets have 4 zones: 3 main and 1 extra – the clutch. WATL targets have 5 main zones and 1 extra.

For example, when playing IATF classic league matches, the majority of the blade in the board counts but in the WATL it is enough to touch the line to have a point. Matches of both leagues are individual. The common rule is that thrower must not step over the throwing line before the axe hits or misses the target; a thrower who steps over the line gets 0 points. Before the competition, a special target for practice throws must be made available. Throwers practicing on the competition target will be disqualified from the competition. There are also championships in other games or trick shots.

There are two main sizes of axes used in the leagues: small for normal rounds and big for "tiebreakers". Weights previously written apply only to the blade. The rules of IATF allow to play only axes with wooden handles, WATL does not have any restrictions.

History 

While axe throwing has been a part of woodsman and timber sports for some time, the resurgent popularity of axe throwing leagues and clubs has been tied to the 2006 formation of the Backyard Axe Throwing League.

Sport axe throwing started in Europe around 2001, with enthusiasts rist gathering in rural settings, and later formalising their sport under the EuroThrowers umbrella.

In 2016, the first commercial axe throwing venues started to open in the UK and Poland.

As of 2020, there are hundreds of axe throwing venues across Canada, USA, Australia, Europe and Thailand. The typical axe throwing venue in North America has at least five lanes and a place to sit, watch and write down points. There may also be bars serving beer and other drinks or snacks. The sessions last around 1–2 hours.

Hazards 

The sport of axe throwing deals with a dangerous weapon, so the throwing area must be kept safe at all times. Axe throwing has the possibility to cause serious injury or even death. If there is an open area behind the target, then spectators and others should be plainly prevented from walking into said area. The target area should be taped off using flags or light fencing materials. A first aid kit and a person trained in first aid and CPR should be at hand in the event of an emergency. For competition in rural and remote areas, the GPS location for the event should be reported in the case of first responders being needed.

Organisations 

The World Axe Throwing League  is the global governing body of urban axe throwing. The National Axe Throwing Federation, founded in the United States, has over 4,500 league members in over 55 cities and seven countries.

The umbrella association for non-commercial axe throwing sports clubs in Europe is the European Throwing Club Flying Blades (EuroThrowers). With more than 250 direct members from 15 nations, it standardizes the competition rules for Europe, which are adhered to by its more than 25 member clubs. The annual World Knife Throwing and Axe Throwing Championship takes place in a different country each year.

See also
 Knife throwing 
 Hammer throw
 Lumberjack World Championship

References

External links
Lumberjack World Championships
 International Axe Throwing Federation
 World Axe Throwing League
 EuroThrowers Axe- and Knife Throwing Association

Lumberjack sports
Axe throwing